A parochet (Hebrew: פרוכת; Ashkenazi pronunciation: paroches) meaning "curtain" or "screen", is the curtain that covers the Torah ark (Aron Kodesh) containing the Torah scrolls (Sifrei Torah) in a synagogue. 

The parochet symbolizes the curtain that covered the Ark of the Covenant, based on :
"He brought the ark into the Tabernacle and placed the screening dividing curtain so that it formed a protective covering before the Ark...".

In most synagogues, the parochet which is used all year round is replaced during the High Holy Days with a white one.

The term parochet is used in the Hebrew Bible to describe the curtain that separated the Holy of Holies (Kodesh Hakodashim) from the main hall (hekhal in Hebrew) of the Temple in Jerusalem. Its use in synagogues is a reference to the centrality of the Temple to Jewish worship.

The U. Nahon Museum of Italian Jewish Art in Jerusalem houses the oldest surviving parochet, dating to 1572.

Gallery

References

Synagogue architecture
Jewish ritual objects